The Oldenburg Class S 3 steam locomotive was a German engine built for the Grand Duchy of Oldenburg State Railways (Großherzoglich Oldenburgische Staatseisenbahnen) in 1903 and 1904. It was based on a Prussian prototype, the Prussian S 3 (see photo), and procured for the route between Wilhelmshaven, Oldenburg and Bremen. It was the first express train engine built for the Oldenburg state railways and also the first one fitted with a steam dome. It replaced the old P 4 passenger train locomotives.

Six engines were built by Hanomag in 1903 and 1904 with numbers 151–154, 160 and 161. They differed in several technical details from their Prussian counterparts, but did not have Lentz valve gear which, later, became common throughout Oldenburg.

The Deutsche Reichsbahn took over all six locomotives and grouped them into DRG Class 13.18, allocating them the numbers 13 1801 to 13 1806. They were retired by 1927.

See also
Grand Duchy of Oldenburg State Railways
List of Oldenburg locomotives and railbuses
Länderbahnen

References 

 
 

4-4-0 locomotives
S 03
Railway locomotives introduced in 1903
Hanomag locomotives
Standard gauge locomotives of Germany
2′B n2v locomotives

Passenger locomotives